Luperosaurus is a genus of lizards, commonly known as camouflage geckos, fringed geckos, wolf geckos, and flap-legged geckos, in the family Gekkonidae. The genus is native to Southeast Asia.

Geographic range
Species in the genus Luperosaurus are found in the Southeast Asian mainland and archipelago, extending from the Malay Peninsula, through the Philippines and Indonesia.

Description
These are small geckos, characterized by the flaps of skin on the front and rear of their limbs and sometimes, along their bodies.

Taxonomy
The original spelling intended was Lyperosaurus (= vexing gecko), for possessing characters from two different genera known to John Edward Gray, who named the genus. Most species of Lupersaurus are known from one or a few specimens.

Behavior
Members of the genus Luperosaurus are presumably highly arboreal.

Species
The following 8 species are recognized as being valid.

Luperosaurus angliit R.M. Brown, Diesmos & Oliveros, 2011
Luperosaurus corfieldi Gaulke, Rösler & R.M. Brown, 2007 – Corfield's fringed gecko
Luperosaurus cumingii Gray, 1845 – Philippine fringed gecko, Philippine wolf gecko, Cuming's flap-legged gecko
Luperosaurus joloensis Taylor, 1918 – Taylor's wolf gecko, Jolo flapped-legged gecko, Taylor's fringed gecko
Luperosaurus kubli R.M. Brown, Diesmos & M.V. Duya, 2007 
Luperosaurus macgregori Stejneger, 1907 – MacGregor's wolf gecko, McGregor's flapped-legged gecko, MacGregor's fringed gecko
Luperosaurus palawanensis W.C. Brown & Alcala, 1978 – Palawan wolf gecko, Palawan flapped-legged gecko
Luperosaurus yasumai Ota, Sengoku & Hikida, 1996 – Yasuma's fringed gecko

Nota bene: A binomial authority in parentheses indicates that the species was originally described in a genus other than Luperosaurus.

References

Further reading
Boulenger GA (1885). Catalogue of the Lizards in the British Museum (Natural History). Second Edition. Volume I. Geckonidæ ... London: Trustees of the British Museum (Natural History). (Taylor and Francis, printers). xii + 436 pp. + Plates I-XXXII. (Genus Luperosaurus, p. 181).
Brown RM, Diesmos AC (2000). "The lizard genus Luperosaurus: taxonomy, history, and conservation prospects for some of the world's rarest lizards". Sylvatrop: Technical Journal of Philippine Ecosystems and Natural Resources 10: 107–124.
Das I (2005). "Nomenclatural Notes on the Generic Nomen Luperosaurus Gray, 1845 (Squamata: Gekkonidae)". Herpetological Review 36 (2): 117-118.
Gray JE (1845). Catalogue of the Lizards in the Collection of the British Museum. London: Trustees of the British Museum. (Edward Newman, printer). xxviii + 289 pp. (Luperosaurus, new genus, p. 163).

 
Lizard genera
Taxa named by John Edward Gray